Cerodrillia nicklesi is a species of sea snail, a marine gastropod mollusk in the family Drilliidae.

Description
The size of an adult shell varies between 6 mm and 9 mm.

Distribution
This species occurs in the demersal zone of the Atlantic Ocean off Western Sahara and Senegal

References

Remarks on a collection of marine Prosobranchs from Senegal. Bulletin de l'Institut Français d'Afrique Noire sér. A(2)18: 514–529, sér. A
 Tucker, J.K. 2004 Catalog of recent and fossil turrids (Mollusca: Gastropoda). Zootaxa 682:1–1295. 
 Ardovini, R. & Cossignani, T. (2004) West African Seashells. L'Informatore Piceno, Ancona, Italy, 319 pp. NIZT682

External links
 
 Holotype at MNHN, Paris

nicklesi
Gastropods described in 1956